Shirley Brill (born 1982) is an Israeli clarinetist living in Germany.

Education and career 
Born in Petah Tikva, Israel, Brill received her musical education in Israel from Yitzhak Katzap at the Petah Tikva Conservatory. From the year 2000, she continued her studies in Germany with Sabine Meyer at the Musikhochschule Lübeck, as well as in the United States with Richard Stoltzman at the New England Conservatory of Music in Boston.

At the age of 16, she began her solo career with the Israel Philharmonic Orchestra under the direction of Zubin Mehta. Since then she has appeared with a large number of international orchestras, such as the Deutsches Symphonie-Orchester Berlin in the Great Hall of the Berlin Philharmonie, and collaborated with the Hamburg Symphony Orchestra, the Geneva Chamber Orchestra, the Symphony Orchestra of the National Theater of Prague, the Polish Radio Symphony Orchestra, the Munich Symphony Orchestra and the New Philharmonic of Westphalia. Brill has worked with leading conductors such as Daniel Barenboim, Jeffrey Tate and Patrick Lange among others.

She has been invited to international festivals such as the BBC Proms, the Festival of Radio France and Montpellier Languedoc Roussillon, the Schubertiade in Austria, the Festival of Davos (Switzerland), Ljubljana (Slovenia), the Schleswig-Holstein Musik Festival, the Mecklenburg Vorpommern Festival , the Heidelberger Frühling, the Rheingau Musik Festival, and the Spannungen chamber music festival.

Her chamber music partners include Daniel Barenboim, Janine Jansen, Sabine Meyer, Emmanuel Pahud, Tabea Zimmermann, the Fauré Piano Quartet  and the Quatuor Terpsycordes.

Since 2009, Brill has been the principal clarinetist of the West–Eastern Divan Orchestra conducted by Daniel Barenboim.

From 2012 Shirley Brill was a guest professor at the Hochschule für Musik "Hanns Eisler" in Berlin and since 2016 a faculty member at the Barenboim–Said Akademie. Since October 2018, Brill has been appointed Professor of Clarinet at the Hochschule für Musik Saar in Saarbrücken, Germany.

Personal life 

Brill is married to Jonathan Aner, Israeli pianist, professor of chamber music in Berlin and her partner in the Duo Brillaner. They have 3 daughters, and live in Berlin.

Instruments 

Shirley Brill plays on clarinets with French fingering system (Boehm), individually made for her by the manufacturer Schwenk & Seggelke. She has normal clarinets in B and A made of grenadilla, mopane (see the photo) and boxwood and a basset clarinet in A made of boxwood.

Awards 

 2003: Special prize of the ARD International Music Competition
 2003: 1st Prize for Duo Brillaner at the 40th Possehl Music Competition
 2006: 2nd Prize International Clarinet Competition Markneukirchen (1st prize not awarded)
 2007: 2nd Prize Concours de Genève (1st prize not awarded)
 2010: Shirley Brill, on behalf of the West–Eastern Divan Orchestra founded by Daniel Barenboim, receives the Prize of the Peace of Westphalia.

Discography 

2005: Duo Brillaner Debut (at MHL) with Jonathan Aner, including:
 Carl Maria von Weber: Grand Duo Concertant Op. 48;
 Camille Saint-Saëns: Sonata Op. 167;
 Paul Ben-Haim: Pastorale Variée;
 Krysztof Penderecki: 3 Miniatures;
 Francis Poulenc: Sonata

2008: Weber & Baermann (at Pan Classics), with the Terpsycordes Quartet, the Geneva Chamber Orchestra and Patrick Lange, including:
 Carl Maria von Weber: Clarinet Concerto in F minor, Op. 73 No. 1;
 Heinrich Baermann: Quintet for clarinet and strings in E flat major, Op. 23,
 Carl Maria von Weber: Quintet for clarinet and strings in B flat major, Op. 34

2009: Petite Pièce: French Miniatures for Clarinet and Piano (at Pan Classics) with Jonathan Aner, including:
 Gabriel Pierné: Sérénade, Andante con Eleganza, Pièce and Canzonetta
 Eugène Bozza: Fantasie Italienne, Idyll, Aria and Claribel
 Philippe Gaubert: Fantaisie, Romance, Allegretto
 Germaine Tailleferre: Trois Danses de la Nouvelle Cythère (Pavane, Nocturne, Galop) and Arabesque
 Claude Debussy: Petite Pièce and Prèmiere Rhapsodie

2012: Françaix & Prokofiev (at Pan Classics) with the Romanian National Radio Orchestra and Adrian Morar, including:
 Jean Françaix: Concerto for clarinet and orchestra
 Sergei Prokofiev: Sonata Op. 94, (arrangement for clarinet and orchestra by Kent Kennan)
 Jean Françaix: Tema con Variazioni

2017: Brahms & Janáček Sonatas (at hänssler Classic) with Jonathan Aner, including:
Johannes Brahms, Sonatas for Clarinet and Piano, Op. 120 Nr. 1 and Nr. 2
Leoš Janáček, Sonata for Clarinet and Piano

The artist is represented on YouTube with audio and video recordings, with audio recordings on Spotify and Deezer.

References

External links 

 
 Shirley Brill Biography at America-Israel Cultural Foundation
 Prof. Shirley Brill at Hochschule für Musik Saar
 Shirley Brill at Concert agent Andreas Braun
 YouTube-Video: Shirley Brill performs "Verdiana" on a Boxwood clarinet made in a modular design by Schwenk & Seggelke.
 YouTube-Video: Shirley Brill performs Artie Shaw Clarinet Concerto
 YouTube-Video: Duo Brillaner, Idylle by Eugène Bozza

1982 births
Living people
Israeli classical clarinetists
Israeli classical musicians
21st-century clarinetists
20th-century clarinetists
20th-century Israeli women musicians
21st-century Israeli women musicians
20th-century classical musicians
21st-century classical musicians
People from Petah Tikva
Musicians from Berlin
New England Conservatory alumni
Israeli expatriates in Germany